Claire McCarthy (born 29 June 1976; also called Claire McCarthy Gibbons) is an Irish long-distance runner.
She represented Ireland at the 2017 World Championships in Athletics where she competed in the marathon and finished in 33rd place.

References

External links

1976 births
Living people
Irish female long-distance runners